Cleanfeed is the name given to various privately administered ISP level content filtering systems operating in the United Kingdom and Canada, and  undergoing testing in Australia with a view to future mandatory implementation. These government-mandated programs originally attempted to block access to child pornography and abuse content located outside of the nation operating the filtering system.

Implementations

United Kingdom
Cleanfeed is a content blocking system technology implemented in the UK by BT, Britain's largest Internet provider as the first to block the Internet Watch Foundation's child abuse image content list. It was created in 2003 and went live in June 2004.

Canada 
Cleanfeed in Canada is a voluntary Internet URL filtering list maintained by Cybertip.ca for use by participating ISPs. Eight major providers, representing approximately 80% of Canada's Internet users, have been using the list since November 2006 to block foreign websites.

Proposed implementations

Australia

Cleanfeed in Australia was a proposed mandatory ISP level content filtration system.  It was proposed by the Kim Beazley led Australian Labor Party opposition in a 2006 press release, with the intention of protecting children who were vulnerable to claimed parental computer illiteracy.  It was announced on 31 December 2007 as a policy to be implemented by the Rudd ALP government, and initial tests in Tasmania produced a report in 2008.  Public opposition and criticism quickly emerged, led by the EFA and gaining irregular mainstream media attention, with a majority of Australians reportedly "strongly against" its implementation. Criticisms included expense, inaccuracy (it will be impossible to ensure only illegal sites are blocked) and the fact that it will be compulsory.  Cleanfeed was quietly abandoned as a policy after the 2010 election.

See also
Content-control software
Golden Shield Project
Internet censorship
Internet censorship in Australia
Censorship in Canada
Internet censorship in the United Kingdom
List of websites blocked in the United Kingdom

References

Censorship in Canada
Internet censorship in the United Kingdom
Content-control software
Censorship in Australia